The Fredericton City Council is the municipal governing body of the city of Fredericton, New Brunswick, Canada.

The twelve members of the mayor-council meets at Fredericton City Hall in the Fredericton Council Chamber. Each member is elected for a four-year term to represent one ward.

Current City Council (Elected in 2021)

References

External links
An Act to Incorporate the City of Fredericton

1848 establishments in New Brunswick
Municipal councils in New Brunswick
Politics of Fredericton